Tadeusz Józef Zawistowski (16 January 1930 – 1 June 2015) was a Polish Roman Catholic bishop.

He was born in Sztabin and ordained a priest in 1955. Zawistowski was appointed to concurrent posts as the auxiliary bishop of Łomża and the titular bishop of Hospita in 1973. He retired in 2006 and died in 2015.

References

1930 births
2015 deaths
People from Augustów County